Aspero is a well-studied Late Preceramic site of the ancient Caral-Supe civilization, located at the mouth of the Supe river on the north-central Peruvian coast. The site covers an area of approximately 35 acres and is made up of two large platform mounds, Huaca de los Sacrificios and Huaca de los Idolos, along with 15 other smaller mounds.

Excavations
After excavations archaeologists have found that each mound was built in stages, having two or three tiers rising about 10m about the surface. They have found ceremonial buildings, plazas, terraces, and large middens. Caches were found in these structures including clay figurines, wooden bowls, feathers, cotton, and string and cane objects.  The diet of Aspero is believed to have been primarily maritime because of its proximity to the Pacific Ocean. Fish hooks and nets have also been found in trash middens and domestic contexts to support this idea. Research at the site led to the controversial "Maritime Foundations of Andean culture" theory, which suggests that the initial development of ancient Peruvian culture was based on fishing, shellfish collecting, and hunting sea mammals, rather than agriculture. The idea is widely disputed by other scholars who claim there is evidence of earlier, inland sites where irrigation agriculture was widespread.

New technology has led to the discoveries that changed our views of Aspero.  Carbon dating has given a more exact date, while also connecting Aspero to other more agriculturally based inland sites.  Carbon dating of the communal structures of the local sites surrounding the Supe Valley places Aspero within 3700~2500 cal. B.C. or the middle to late Archaic Period.

These connections have led archaeologists to believe that Aspero wasn't mainly a maritime culture, but an agriculture-based community with more local maritime traits.  In other words, Aspero exploited the trade and knowledge of agriculture from the inland sites, such as Caral and Lurihuasi.  This does not completely disprove the maritime theory because Aspero was taking advantage of its proximity to the Pacific Ocean for maritime resources.  These new dates not only provide an insight into how Aspero developed, but also show the cultural connection that Aspero had with its neighboring sites. Researchers have established a general timeline which links Aspero and its adjacent sites to a much larger cultural system that spread across several valleys.

See also
Andean preceramic
Huaricanga

References

Bibliography
Giesso, Martin, 2008, Historical Dictionary of Ancient South America, The Scarecrow Press Inc. Lanham, Maryland, Toronto and Plymouth, UK.
Isbell William, H. and Helaine Silverman, 2006, Andean Archaeology III: North and South, Springer.
Moseley, Michael E., 2001, The Incas and their Ancestors. The Archaeology of Peru. Revised Edition. Thames & Hudson
Pozoroski Shelia and Thomas Pozoroski, 2008, Early Cultural Complexity on the Coast of Peru, in The Handbook of American Archaeology, edited by Helaine Silverman and William H. Isbell, Springer, pp: 603-631.

Stanish, Charles, 2001, The Origin of State Societies in South America. Annual Review of Anthropology, Vol. 30, pp. 41–64.

External links
Aspero archaeology.about.com

Archaeological sites in Peru
History of Peru
Andean preceramic
Norte Chico civilization
Archaeological sites in Lima Region